Datuk Nur Jazlan bin Mohamed (born 15 February 1966) is a Malaysian politician who served as the Deputy Minister of Home Affairs I in the Barisan Nasional (BN) administration under former Prime Minister Najib Razak and former Minister Ahmad Zahid Hamidi from July 2015 to May 2018, Member of Parliament (MP) for Pulai from March 2004 to May 2018 and Chairman of the Public Accounts Committee from June 2013 to July 2015. He is a member and Division Chairman of Pulai of the United Malays National Organisation (UMNO), a component party of the ruling Barisan Nasional (BN) coalition which is aligned with another ruling Perikatan Nasional (PN) coalition. He is seen as a great attacker and opposition of PN by repeatedly and frequently voicing attacks and oppositions against it despite his coalition is aligned with PN coalition and joining its administration.

Personal life
Nur Jazlan is married and has three children. He is the eldest son of former Information Minister Mohamed Rahmat, who was of Javanese and Chinese descent. Nur Jazlan's mother Puan Sri Salbiah Abdul Hamid was of Teochew Chinese heritage, and associates closely with the Chinese community. He is a columnist for The Malaysian Insider.

Education
Nur Jazlan is an alumnus from the South Bank Polytehnics, United Kingdom and Emile Woolf School of Accountancy, London.

Corporate career
In the year 1990, Nur Jazlan was appointed as one of the Administrative Executives in IGB Corporation Berhad. he stayed in IGB for a year before moving to Equatorial hotel (M) Sdn Bhd and later in 1994 he was appointed as the Finance Officer for the joint venture of Proton-DRB Sdn Bhd. He stayed there up till the year 2004, where he left his corporate life to contest in the 12th General Election.

Political career
Nur Jazlan was elected to federal Parliament in the 2004 election for the UMNO-held seat of Pulai, previously held by Abdul Kadir Annuar. He ran for the Deputy Presidency of UMNO in 2008, citing the need for UMNO to regenerate after the 2008 election, stating "UMNO must realise it is at the crossroads—it's a matter of life and death." His candidacy was described by former Prime Minister Mahathir Mohamed as one of a "joker". By the end of October 2008, Nur Jazlan had withdrawn from the race. In the 2013 election, he retained his seat, withstanding a challenge from senior Pan-Malaysian Islamic Party (PAS) politician Salahuddin Ayub, a local but Kelantan-based MP who switched back to Johor to seek to unseat Nur Jazlan. Days before the 2018 election, he tweeted that the postal votes will not have significant effects to the outcome of the election, as a response to the complaints of delayed postal votes. However, he was defeated by Pakatan Harapan (PH) politician Salahuddin Ayub in the election, along with other prominent politicians from UMNO.

Controversy
In July 2015, Public Accounts Committee (PAC) chief Nur Jazlan has come under heavy fire for postponing the hearing into 1MDB scandal from August to October.

Election results

Honours
  :
  Commander of the Order of Kinabalu (PGDK) - Datuk (2000)

See also
Pulai (federal constituency)

References

Bibliography
 Hussien Alattas (Syed.), Perang di Parit Raja, Al-Suhaimi, 1991

Living people
1966 births
People from Selangor
Malaysian people of Malay descent
Malaysian people of Javanese descent
Malaysian politicians of Chinese descent
Malaysian Muslims
Malaysian accountants
Commanders of the Order of Kinabalu
United Malays National Organisation politicians
Members of the Dewan Rakyat
21st-century Malaysian politicians